Ruff Ryders Indy is an independent record label founded by brothers Darrin "Dee" Dean and Joaquin "Waah" Dean.

History
In 2010, Joaquin and Darin Dean decided to revamp Ruff Ryders through a new venture known as Ruff Ryders Indy, as a Fontana/Universal affiliated distribution company that provides hands-on mentoring and consulting services to independent labels. Joaquin Dean has helped introduce artists like DMX, Eve, Swizz Beatz, The LOX, and others into pop culture, selling over 35 million records in the process.

Ruff Ryders Indy, Inc. has signed new artists to the label such as MOOK, Lil Waah (son of Joaquin Dean), Shella, and Hugo. The company is releasing its first new album a compilation that includes the established Ruff Ryders artists, DMX, Eve, LOX, Drag-On, Swizz Beatz, and Cassidy with the new artists entitled; Ruff Ryders Past, Present, Future on November 21, 2011, 2011. A third album by Drag-On will follow the release of the compilation, with additional music to be released by established and new artists of the label.

Artists

Current acts

External links

American record labels